Chi Tau is a defunct national fraternity.

Chi Tau may also refer to:

Chi Tau (local), a local fraternity organized in 1939 at Chico State University, unaffiliated with the national fraternity, and notorious for a 2005 hazing death.
Chi Tauri, the name of a star system in the constellation of Taurus.
Chitauri, a fictional race of aliens appearing in Marvel Comics.